Mogami can refer to:

Mogami District, Yamagata - a district in northern Yamagata Prefecture, Japan
Mogami, Yamagata - a town in Mogami District
Mogami clan
Mogami River - a river in Yamagata Prefecture
Mogami Station - JR East railway station in Mogami, Yamagata
Mogami Cable - Mogami Wire & Cable Corp, a Japanese manufacturer of high quality audio and video cable
Japanese cruiser Mogami (1908) - a dispatch vessel of the early Imperial Japanese Navy
Japanese cruiser Mogami (1934) - a World War II heavy cruiser in the Imperial Japanese Navy and lead ship of the Mogami-class
JDS Mogami (DE-212) - an Isuzu-class destroyer escort launched in 1961 and stricken in 1991.
JS Mogami (FFM-1)  - a Mogami-class frigate launched in 2021.
Tohru Mogami, Japanese engineer